Sura language may refer to:

Mwaghavul language (Nigeria)
Surjapuri language (India)
Tatuyo language (Colombia)